Frederick Culley (8 March 1879 – 3 November 1942) was a British film actor. He is best remembered as the kindly Dr. Sutton in The Four Feathers (1939).  His Father, Richard Palethorpe Culley, was an entrepreneur and philanthropist and his mother, Mary Widgery, came from a family of artists.  Her father was landscape painter, William Widgery, and her brother, Frederick Widgery, painted in the same genre.  Frederick Culley began his career in the theater, where his talent was recognized by the good reviews he usually received in the London press.  He appeared briefly in silent films before entering talkies but, by 1930, Culley was already 51 years old and his roles were primarily supporting ones. He was remarkably effective as Dr. Sutton, using a cane and convincing that he was in pain or discomfort because, in the book that inspired the movie, his character had suffered an accident to his leg.  There was nothing wrong with the actor's own legs.  Culley appeared in several other Alexander Korda productions.  Frederick Culley was married to Mildred C. Thomas in 1920.  They had no children.  The actor died of lung cancer at the Three Swans Hotel, Hungerford, Berkshire, where he was staying.

Filmography

References

External links
 

1879 births
1942 deaths
20th-century English male actors
English male film actors
Male actors from Plymouth, Devon